Sabz Gaz-e Sofla (also Romanized as Sabz Gaz-e Soflá; also known as Sabz Gaz-e Pā’īn) is a village in Poshtkuh Rural District, in the Central District of Khash County, Sistan and Baluchestan Province, Iran. At the 2006 census, its population was 161, in 27 families.

References 

Populated places in Khash County